The Division of Blaxland is an Australian electoral division in the state of New South Wales.

Blaxland runs from the North Shore and Western railway line in the north to Marion Street and the Bankstown railway line in the south, between Woodville Road in the west and Stacey Street in the east, covering 61 square kilometers of Labor heartland in the Cumberland and Canterbury-Bankstown local government areas in Sydney's west, with strong Middle Eastern and East Asian communities.

History

The division was created in 1949 and is named after Gregory Blaxland, a farmer and an early Australian explorer of the Blue Mountains in New South Wales. The division has been a comfortably safe seat for Labor since its creation; western Sydney has been a Labor heartland for over a century. Initially created as a notional Lang Labor seat, the official ALP narrowly won it over former NSW Premier Jack Lang. This is the only election at which (official) Labor has won less than 56 percent of the two-party vote, as well as the only one in which it did not win an outright majority on the first count.

Its most notable member has been Paul Keating, who was Prime Minister of Australia from 1991 until 1996 after having previously served as Treasurer of Australia from 1983 until 1991. In 2007, Keating's successor, Michael Hatton, lost preselection for this seat to current member Jason Clare, who was a staffer for former New South Wales Premier Bob Carr.

In 2017, the division had the highest percentage of "No" responses in the Australian Marriage Law Postal Survey, with 73.9% of the electorate's respondents to the survey responding "No". The Survey had strong opposition from Muslim communities in the electorate.

Boundaries
Since 1984, federal electoral division boundaries in Australia have been determined at redistributions by a redistribution committee appointed by the Australian Electoral Commission. Redistributions occur for the boundaries of divisions in a particular state, and they occur every seven years, or sooner if a state's representation entitlement changes or when divisions of a state are malapportioned.

The division is based in the western suburbs of Sydney, and includes the suburbs of Bass Hill, Berala, Birrong, Chester Hill, Georges Hall, Lansdowne, Lansvale, Potts Hill, Regents Park, Sefton, and Yagoona; and parts of the business park and airport at Bankstown Airport; as well as parts of Auburn, Bankstown, Canley Vale, Carramar, Condell Park, Guildford, Lidcombe, Merrylands, South Granville, Villawood, and Yennora.

Demographics 
Blaxland is a socially conservative and historically working-class electorate which includes sizable immigrant populations from China, Vietnam, and the Middle East. It has one of the highest Muslim populations in Australia at 29.2%. According to the 2016 census, 20.1% of electors spoke Arabic at home, the highest percentage in Australia. The electorate remains an electoral stronghold for the center-left Labor Party.

Members

Election results

References

External links
 Division of Blaxland - Australian Electoral Commission

Electoral divisions of Australia
Constituencies established in 1949
1949 establishments in Australia